Francisco "Paco" Llorente Gento (born 21 May 1965) is a Spanish retired footballer who played mostly as a right winger.

He amassed La Liga totals of 207 games and 11 goals over the course of 13 seasons, with Atlético Madrid, Real Madrid and Compostela.

Club career
Llorente was born in Valladolid, Castile and León. After a brief youth passage at Real Madrid he signed with neighbours Atlético Madrid, being fairly used over two seasons. In 1987, after displays of speed and skills, he re-joined Real.

Also being able to appear as a forward, Llorente found it difficult to break into the starting XI, barred by Míchel in his natural position and Hugo Sánchez and Emilio Butragueño up front. His moment of glory came during the second leg of the second round of the 1987–88 European Cup, as he appeared from the bench with Real trailing 1–0 at FC Porto (2–1 win at home) to assist Míchel twice after powerful flank runs, as his uncle Francisco in the 50/60s.

In 1989–90, after the arrival of John Toshack as coach, Llorente found his playing time drastically cut; in his later years with the club, with Benito Floro at the helm, he even saw some time as right back. He retired in 1998 after four top-flight seasons with lowly SD Compostela, aged 33.

International career
Llorente played once for Spain, against Albania for the UEFA Euro 1988 qualifiers, on 18 November 1987, scoring one of the five without response in Seville. He did not make the cut for the final stages in West Germany, however.

Personal life
Llorente hailed from a sporting family.

The nephew of legendary Real Madrid footballer Francisco Gento, his son Marcos also played for the club. His father-in-law Ramón Grosso did the same.

Honours
Real Madrid
La Liga: 1987–88, 1988–89, 1989–90
Copa del Rey: 1989–90, 1992–93
Supercopa de España: 1988, 1989, 1990, 1993

References

External links

1965 births
Living people
Footballers from Valladolid
Spanish footballers
Association football wingers
Association football utility players
La Liga players
Segunda División players
CD Móstoles footballers
Atlético Madrid B players
Atlético Madrid footballers
Real Madrid CF players
SD Compostela footballers
Spain under-21 international footballers
Spain under-23 international footballers
Spain international footballers
Gento family